Birkwood Castle, also known as Birkwood House, is a Gothic country house situated in Lesmahagow, South Lanarkshire, Scotland. Built in the 18th century, it was greatly expanded by the McKirdy family. In 1920 it was purchased by the local authority for use as a hospital. Following closure of the hospital, attempts have been made to redevelop the building. The house is the subject for numerous ghostlore stories.

History
Birkwood Castle was built in the late 18th century, and the original villa now forms the north wing of the house. It was greatly expanded in the Gothic style in 1858, and again in 1890 when the architect James Thomson of Glasgow designed the large west wing.

In 1920 the house was purchased by Lanarkshire County Council for £10,000,  and opened in July 1923 as a "certified Institution for Mental Defectives" under the terms of the Mental Deficiency and Lunacy (Scotland) Act 1913.The hospital cared for boys and girls with learning disabilities, and was "one of the few psychiatric hospitals which dealt exclusively with children."  Following the reorganisation of mental health care in the 1990s, the hospital closed fully in 2005.

Following closure of the hospital plans were approved to convert the house to a hotel in 2009, but the developer went into liquidation before work started. In 2016, South Lanarkshire Council gave planning permission for a £15 million conversion of the house to a hotel. This hotel was part of a planned £80 million redevelopment of the castle and its grounds. In January 2018, the castle was put up for sale after its owners went into administration. Later in the year, it was recommended that Birkwood Castle was demolished, as it was a "major safety risk". The plan was to keep the bell tower and front entrance, as they were structurally secure.

Ghostlore
The house has allegedly been haunted by a cigar-smoking spirit and the ghost of a man stabbed through the throat. When a group of Glasgow paranormal experts filmed at the house in 2013 for their work Haunted Planet TV, they described the house as "one of the most active locations they had ever filmed." In 2015, part of the house's wall collapsed, and there were reports of an explosion. Local paranormal experts attributed this to the house being haunted.

References

19th-century establishments in Scotland
Castles in South Lanarkshire
Category B listed buildings in South Lanarkshire
Country houses in South Lanarkshire
Defunct hospitals in Scotland
Reportedly haunted locations in Scotland
Hospitals in South Lanarkshire
Listed hospital buildings in Scotland
Listed castles in Scotland
Category B listed houses in Scotland